Francis Anthony Small (28 August 1930 – 24 February 2015) was a New Zealand diplomat.

In 1956 Small graduated Bachelor of Laws from Victoria University College. In 1963 he was acting head of the legal division of the Ministry of Foreign Affairs. From 1969 to 1976 he was New Zealand's deputy permanent representative at the Headquarters of the United Nations in New York City. From 19 December 1977 to 1982 he was ambassador in Vienna with accreditation in Warsaw, East Berlin and Budapest. From 1982 to 1985 he was ambassador in Beijing, and from 1986 to 1990 he was ambassador in Rome with accreditation in Madrid.

Small died on 24 February 2015, and was buried at Clareville Cemetery, Carterton.

References

1930 births
2015 deaths
Ambassadors of New Zealand to Austria
Ambassadors of New Zealand to China
Ambassadors of New Zealand to Italy
Burials at Clareville Cemetery